The Task Force 1st Battalion, 28th Infantry Regiment (Task Force 1-28 IN), is a United States infantry battalion task force, located at Fort Benning, Georgia. It is under the direct command of the 3rd Infantry Division and exists as the only organic task force in the U.S. Army Forces Command. It has expanded subordinate units like a 105mm howitzer battery, an engineer company, an expanded support company, and additional staff for the battalion headquarters.

References

External links
https://www.facebook.com/128BlackLions/

Infantry battalions of the United States Army